Dane Chisholm (born 4 July 1990) is a France international rugby league footballer who plays as a  for the Keighley Cougars in Betfred League 1.

He previously played for the Sheffield Eagles and the Melbourne Storm and the Bradford Bulls and the Hull Kingston Rovers

Background
Chisholm was born in Manly, New South Wales, Australia.

Playing career

Melbourne Storm
After playing for junior club Mullumbimby Giants, Chisholm was a part of the under 18s NRRRL premiership win in 2008 for the Giants. 

Chisholm signed with Melbourne Storm and was called into their under-20s side. He played in the Storm's Toyota Cup win over Wests Tigers in the 2009 Grand Final.

Chisholm made his NRL debut for Melbourne in round 10 of the 2011 NRL season against Canberra.

Wests Tigers
In November 2011, Chisholm signed to play for Wests Tigers in the 2012 NRL season. He failed to make an appearance in first grade, playing for feeder team Balmain Ryde Eastwood Tigers and was a member of the side that lost the NSW Cup grand final.

Manly-Warringah Sea Eagles
Chisholm signed for the Manly-Warringah Sea Eagles in the 2013 NRL season.

Manly Marlins
In 2014 he made the switch to Rugby Union signing with Manly Marlins in the Shute Shield.

Canterbury-Bankstown Bulldogs
Chisholm was on a loan deal from the Canterbury-Bankstown Bulldogs until the end of the 2015 season.

Hull Kingston Rovers
He made his debut for Hull Kingston Rovers, in the final game of the First Utility Super League season, against reigning Super League Champions, St Helens. He then went on to play six out of seven games, in the Super 8s Qualifiers. In total, he made seven appearances, scoring on three occasions for Rovers.

Bradford Bulls
Chisholm signed a one and a half year deal to play for RFL Championship side Bradford.

2016 - 2016 Season

Chisholm featured in Round 21 against Whitehaven to Round 23 against Featherstone Rovers. Chisholm played in the Championship Shield Game 1 against Whitehaven to Game 5 Swinton then in Game 7 Sheffield to the final against Sheffield.

2017 - 2017 Season

After spending the start of 2017 with Sheffield, Chisholm returned to Bradford. He featured in Round 15 against Hull Kingston Rovers. However he suffered a season ending injury. Chisholm signed a two-year extension with Bradford at the end of the season.

2018 - 2018 Season

Chisholm played in Round 2 against the London Skolars to Round 22 against Workington Town then in Round 24 West Wales Raiders to Final Workington Town. He also featured in the 2018 Challenge Cup in Round 3 against the West Wales Raiders to Round 4 Hunslet R.L.F.C.. At the end of the season he signed a one-year extension with the Bradford side.

2019 - 2019 Season

Chisholm featured in the pre-season friendlies against York, Huddersfield and the Toronto Wolfpack. Chisholm played in Round 1 match against Featherstone to Round 2 against Swinton then in Round 4 against York. Chisholm was sent on loan to Featherstone Rovers for the remainder of the season, after a fall out with club coach John Kear. He then signed with Featherstone on a permanent basis until the end of the 2019 season.

Featherstone Rovers
In 2019 Chisholm signed for Featherstone Rovers

He played for Featherstone in the club's 2021 Million Pound Game loss against Toulouse Olympique.

Statistics
Statistics do not include pre-season friendlies.

International
In 2010, Chisholm was named in the French preliminary squad for the 2010 European Cup. Chisholm qualifies for the French side because of his mother and grandparents. He played 4 games for France in 2011, debuting at fullback in France's loss to the England Knights. He also scored 3 tries in France's 42-10 victory over Scotland.

Family
Rick, Dane's father, played in 30 first-grade matches for Manly and Newtown in the early 1980s. His uncle Wayne Chisholm played over 100 games with South Sydney. Dane has since gone on to start a family of his own, he has a little girl named Nyah Kiki a boy named Kai Ricky after his late father & wife Chelsey.

References

External links
Bradford Bulls profile
Melbourne Storm profile

1990 births
Living people
Australian rugby league players
Australian expatriate sportspeople in England
French expatriate sportspeople in England
Australian people of French descent
Australian people of Vietnamese descent
Balmain Ryde-Eastwood Tigers players
Bradford Bulls players
Featherstone Rovers players
France national rugby league team players
Hull Kingston Rovers players
Keighley Cougars players
London Broncos players
Melbourne Storm players
Rugby league fullbacks
Rugby league five-eighths
Rugby league wingers
Rugby league centres
Rugby league halfbacks
Rugby league players from New South Wales
Rugby union players from New South Wales
Sheffield Eagles players